"Run to Him" is a song written by Gerry Goffin and Jack Keller and performed by Bobby Vee featuring the Johnny Mann Singers.   It was produced by Snuff Garrett, and was featured on Vee's 1962 album, Take Good Care of My Baby. One of the musicians on the song was session drummer Earl Palmer.

Chart performance
"Run to Him" reached #2 on the Billboard Hot 100, and was kept from the #1 position by The Lion Sleeps Tonight by The Tokens.  It also reached #4 in Canada, and #6 in the UK in 1961.

The single's B-side, "Walkin' with My Angel", reached #53 on the Billboard chart and #89 in Canada.

Charts

Other versions
Ivo Robić released a version in Germany in April 1962 as part of an EP entitled Geh' Zu Ihm.
Little Eva released a version entitled "Run to Her" as the B-side to her single "Makin' with the Magilla" in October 1964.
Jimmy Tarbuck released a version as the B-side to his single "Lucky Jim" in March 1972.
 Donny Osmond released a version on his 1972 solo album Too Young.
Beverly Bremers released a version of the song entitled "Run to Her" as a single in March 1973.
Susie Allanson released a version as a single entitled "Run to Her" in 1981 that reached #53 on the country chart.  It was featured on her album Sleepless Nights.
Labi Siffre released a version as a single in January 1981.

References

1961 songs
1961 singles
1973 singles
1981 singles
Songs with lyrics by Gerry Goffin
Songs written by Jack Keller (songwriter)
Bobby Vee songs
Little Eva songs
Beverly Bremers songs
Susie Allanson songs
Labi Siffre songs
Song recordings produced by Snuff Garrett
Liberty Records singles
Polydor Records singles
Scepter Records singles